The C&C 26 is a Canadian sailboat, that was designed by C&C Design and first built in 1976. The C&C 26 design was developed into the C&C 26 Encounter in 1978.

The C&C 26 Wave is a similarly-named boat, but is actually a development of the C&C 27 Mark V.

Production
The boat was built by C&C Yachts in Canada, starting in 1976, but it is now out of production.

Design
The C&C 26 is a small recreational keelboat, built predominantly of fiberglass, with wood trim. It has a  masthead sloop rig, an internally-mounted spade-type rudder and a fixed fin keel. The boat is fitted with an inboard engine.

Variants
C&C 26
This model was introduced in 1976.
C&C 26 Encounter
This model was derived from the C&C 26, with a shorter rig and more displacement. It was introduced in 1978. The design has a PHRF racing average handicap of 216 with a high of 213 and low of 222.

See also
List of sailing boat types

Similar sailboats
Beneteau First 26
Beneteau First 265
C&C 26 Wave
Contessa 26
Dawson 26
Discovery 7.9
Grampian 26
Herreshoff H-26
Hunter 26
Hunter 26.5
Hunter 260
Hunter 270
MacGregor 26
Mirage 26
Nash 26
Nonsuch 26
Outlaw 26
Paceship PY 26
Parker Dawson 26
Pearson 26
Sandstream 26
Tanzer 26
Yamaha 26

References

External links

Keelboats
1970s sailboat type designs
Sailing yachts
Sailboat type designs by C&C Design
Sailboat types built by C&C Yachts